Kashkabad (also Romanized as Kashkābād; also known as Māneh and Mānesh) is a village in Atrak Rural District, Maneh District, Maneh and Samalqan County, North Khorasan Province, Iran. At the 2006 census, its population was 533, in 128 families.

References 

Populated places in Maneh and Samalqan County